The Delightful Bars is the second album by the North Carolina rapper Rapper Big Pooh. It was released for digital and retail versions on March 24, 2009, followed by other four versions, with different track lists and songs: "North American Pie" (included two different covers), "Belgian Chocolate", "Japanese Daifoku" and the iTunes exclusive track list. Produced by 9th Wonder and Khrysis, that helped in the production of his last album, Sleepers, added production of IllMind and others. Pooh also collaborated in the production, and wrote all the sounds, the musics with collaborations, has these parts in the song, written by the guest, these include Chaundon, Jay Rock, Darien Brockington, Torae among others.

Track listing
There are several track lists from the album.

References

2009 albums
Hip hop albums by American artists
Albums produced by Khrysis
Albums produced by Illmind
Albums produced by 9th Wonder
Albums produced by Oh No (musician)
Albums produced by Jake One